Arcticibacter svalbardensis  is a Gram-negative, rod-shaped and non-motile bacterium from the genus of Arcticibacter which has been isolated from surface soil from Ny-Ålesund on Svalbard.

References 

Sphingobacteriia
Bacteria described in 2013